Asian-Americans are an ethnic group in the United States, denoting Americans of Asian descent. The phrase Asian-American was coined by Yuji Ichioka in 1968 during the founding of the Asian American Political Alliance, and started to be used by the U.S. Census in 1980.

Firsts by Asian-Americans in various fields have historically marked footholds, often leading to more widespread cultural change. The shorthand phrase for them is "breaking the color barrier". One commonly cited example is that of Wataru Misaka, who became the first person of color, and the first Asian-American, to be a National Basketball Association player (in 1947.)

Arts and entertainment

Academy Awards 

 1955: James Wong Howe becomes the first Asian-American to win an Academy Award, the Academy Award for Best Cinematography for The Rose Tattoo.
 1957: Miyoshi Umeki becomes the first Asian-American to win the Academy Award for Best Supporting Actress, for Sayonara. 
 1984: Haing Somnang Ngor becomes the first Asian-American to win the Academy Award for Best Supporting Actor, for The Killing Fields.
 1990: Steven Okazaki becomes the first Asian-American to win the Academy Award for Best Documentary (Short Subject), for Days of Waiting: The Life & Art Of Estelle Ishigo.
 1997: Chris Tashima becomes the first Asian-American to win the Academy Award for Best Live Action Short Film, for Visas and Virtue.
 2019: Kazu Hiro becomes the first Asian-American to win the Academy Award for Best Makeup and Hairstyling, for Bombshell. This was his first win following his naturalization.
 2021: Steven Yeun becomes the first Asian-American to be nominated for the Academy Award for Best Actor for Minari.
 2022: Janet Yang is elected as the first Asian-American President of the Academy of Motion Picture Arts and Sciences.

Fashion 

 2012: Alexander Wang becomes the first Asian-American creative director and head of a French haute couture house (Balenciaga).

Film (aside from the Academy Awards) 

 1919-1961: Anna May Wong is considered to be the first major Asian-American film star in the world. 
 2005: Dayyan Eng becomes the first Asian-American director to have a film nominated for Best Picture at the Chinese academy awards (for Waiting Alone).
2018: John Cho becomes the first Asian-American actor to headline a mainstream Hollywood thriller, Searching.
 2020: Awkwafina becomes the first Asian-American to win the Golden Globe Award for best actress in the musical or comedy category, for The Farewell.

Literature (aside from the Pulitzer and Nobel Prizes) 

 1928: Dhan Gopal Mukerji becomes the first Asian-American to win a Newbery Medal, for Gay Neck, the Story of a Pigeon.

Music 

 2010: Far East Movement becomes the first Asian-American music group to earn a No. 1 on the Billboard Hot 100, for Like a G6.

Pulitzer Prizes 

 1937: Gobind Behari Lal becomes the first Asian-American to win a Pulitzer Prize in Reporting.
 1990: Sheryl WuDunn becomes the first Asian-American woman to win a Pulitzer Prize in Reporting.

Television 

 1951: Anna May Wong becomes the first Asian-American to lead a U.S. television show, with her work on The Gallery of Madame Liu-Tsong.
 2018: Aziz Ansari becomes the first Asian-American to win a Golden Globe for acting in television; specifically, he won the Golden Globe Award for Best Actor – Television Series Musical or Comedy for Master of None.
 2019: Bowen Yang becomes the first cast member on Saturday Night Live of full Asian descent.

Theater 

 1972: Frank Chin becomes the first Asian-American to have a play produced on a major New York stage (the play is The Chickencoop Chinaman.)

Other 

 2000: Angela Perez Baraquio Grey becomes the first Asian-American to win the Miss America (2001) pageant.

Business and commerce 

 1986: Gerald Tsai becomes the first Asian-American CEO of a Fortune 500 company (The American Can Company; #140 on the 1986 list).
 2013: Kevin Tsujihara becomes the first Asian-American CEO of a major Hollywood studio (Warner Bros Entertainment).

Dentistry 

 2002: Dr. Eugene Sekiguchi is elected as the first Asian-American president of the American Dental Association.

Diplomacy 

 1989: Julia Chang Bloch becomes the first Asian-American U.S. ambassador, as US Ambassador to Nepal.

Education 
 1974: Fujio Matsuda becomes the first Asian-American president of a major American university, as president of the University of Hawaiʻi.
 1990: Chang-Lin Tien becomes the first Asian-American to lead a major American research university, as Chancellor of UC Berkeley.
 2009: Jim Yong Kim becomes the first Asian-American president of an Ivy League institution, as president of Dartmouth College.

Journalism 

 1937: Ella Kam Oon Chun becomes the first Asian-American woman reporter on The Honolulu Advertiser.
 1943: Ah Jook Ku becomes the first Asian-American reporter for the Associated Press.
 1970: Al Young becomes the first Asian American U.S. mainland sportswriter at a metro daily newspaper The Bridgeport (CT) Post-Telegram.
 1993: Connie Chung becomes the first Asian-American to anchor one of America's major network newscasts (CBS Evening News).

Judiciary and politics 

 1946: Wing F. Ong becomes the first Asian-American to be elected to a state legislative body in the United States, in the Arizona House of Representatives.
 1957: Dalip Singh Saund becomes the first Asian-American elected to the United States Congress, as a Representative for California's 29th district.
 1964: Hiram Fong, a Republican, becomes the first Asian-American U.S. Senator.
 1964: Hiram Fong becomes the first Asian-American candidate for U.S. president.
 1965: Patsy Mink becomes the first Asian American woman elected to the U.S. Congress.
 1971: Norman Mineta becomes the first Asian-American mayor of a major city (San Jose, CA) in the United States.
 1971: Herbert Choy becomes the first Asian-American U.S. federal court judge, appointed to the U.S. court of appeals for the ninth circuit.
 1972: Patsy Mink becomes the first Asian-American Democratic candidate for U.S. president. 
 1974: George Ariyoshi becomes the first Asian-American governor of a U.S. state.
 1984: Joy Cherian becomes the first Asian-American Commissioner of the Equal Employment Opportunity Commission.
 2000: Norman Mineta becomes the first Asian American to hold a presidential cabinet post when he is appointed as the United States Secretary of Commerce.
 2002: Kenneth P. Moritsugu becomes the first Asian-American Surgeon General.
 2010: Daniel Inouye becomes the first Asian-American President pro tempore of the United States Senate, making him the highest-ranking Asian-American politician in American history.
 2015: Yumi Hogan becomes the first Asian-American First Lady of Maryland.
 2020: Kamala Harris becomes the first Asian-American (and first African-American) major party candidate for vice president.
 2021:  Kamala Harris becomes the first Asian-American (and first African-American) Vice President of the United States.
 2021:  Kamala Harris becomes the first Asian-American President of the United States Senate.
 2021: Kamala Harris becomes the first Asian-American Acting President of the United States.

Military 

 1944: Kurt Lee becomes the first Asian-American officer in the Marine Corps.
 1959: Gordon Chung-Hoon becomes the first Asian-American flag officer in the United States Navy.
 1999: Eric Shinseki becomes the first Asian American four-star general and Chief of Staff of the United States Army.
 2009: Eric Shinseki becomes the first Asian American United States Secretary of Veterans Affairs.
 2015: Harry Harris Jr. becomes the first Asian-American to command the U.S. Pacific Command (USPACOM).
 2020: JoAnne S. Bass becomes the first Asian-American to hold the senior enlisted position in the U.S. Air Force, as the 19th Chief Master Sergeant of the U.S. Air Force.

Politics

Federal

2000: Norman Mineta is appointed United States Secretary of Commerce, becoming first Asian American to serve as a U.S. Cabinet Secretary.

State
1996: Gary Locke is elected Governor of Washington, becoming first Asian American to be elected Governor of a mainland U.S. state.

Religion 

 1999: Angela Warnick Buchdahl becomes the first Asian-American to be ordained as a cantor upon being ordained by HUC-JIR, an American seminary for Reform Judaism.
 2001: Angela Warnick Buchdahl becomes the first Asian-American to be ordained as a rabbi upon being ordained by HUC-JIR, an American seminary for Reform Judaism.
 2002: Ignatius Wang becomes the first Asian-American bishop of the Roman Catholic Church.

Science and technology

Aerospace and aviation 

 1985: Ellison Onizuka becomes the first Asian-American in space, as an astronaut on the space shuttle Discovery.

Mathematics 

 1982: Shing-Tung Yau becomes the first Asian-American to be awarded the Fields Medal.

Physics 
 1975: Chien-Shiung Wu becomes the first woman (not just Asian American) president of the American Physical Society.
 1978: Chien-Shiung Wu becomes the first person (not just Asian American) to win the Wolf Prize in Physics.

Nobel Prizes 

 1957: Chen-Ning Yang and Tsung-dao Lee won the Nobel Prize in Physics.  They would later become US citizens in 1964 and 1962 respectively.
 1976: Samuel C. C. Ting becomes the first U.S. born Asian American to win the Nobel Prize in Physics.

Sports

Baseball 

 1956: Bobby Balcena becomes the first Asian-American to play in Major League Baseball, playing two games for the Cincinnati Redlegs.
 2008: Don Wakamatsu hired as the first Asian-American Major League Baseball manager.
 2020: Dave Roberts becomes the first Asian-American baseball manager to win the World Series.
 2020: Kim Ng is hired by the Miami Marlins as the first Asian-American to serve as general manager of an MLB team.

Basketball 

 1947: Wataru Misaka breaks the color barrier of the National Basketball Association (NBA), becoming the first Asian-American to play in the league.
 2008: Erik Spoelstra becomes the first Asian-American head coach of the National Basketball Association (for the Miami Heat). He is the first Asian-American head coach in any of the four major North American sports leagues.
 2010: Rich Cho becomes the first Asian-American general manager of an NBA team, the Portland Trail Blazers.
 2019: Jeremy Lin becomes the first Asian-American NBA Champion.
 2020: Mike Magpayo is hired as men's head coach at UC Riverside, becoming the first Asian American to hold this position in NCAA Division I men's basketball.

Figure skating 

 1985: Tiffany Chin becomes the first Asian-American U.S. Figure Skating national champion.

Football (Gridiron football) 
 1927: Walter Achiu becomes the first Asian American to play in the National Football League when he plays for the now defunct Dayton Triangles of the NFL. 
 1962: Roman Gabriel becomes the first Asian-American NFL quarterback.
 2020: Younghoe Koo becomes the first Asian-American to lead the NFL in scoring in a season. He also led the league in field goals made.
 2020: Koo becomes the first Asian-American named to the NFL Pro Bowl.

Golf 
 1994: Tiger Woods becomes the first Asian-American to win the United States Amateur Championship. (Woods' mixed ancestry – ¼ Chinese, ¼ Thai, ¼ African-American, ⅛ white, and ⅛ Native American – also made him the first African-American to achieve this feat. He was also the first of only five golfers of primarily non-European descent to win a men's major, with the others being Vijay Singh (an Indian Fijian), Michael Campbell (a Māori from New Zealand), Y.E. Yang (South Korean), and Collin Morikawa (Japanese American).)

Olympics 

 1948: Victoria Manalo Draves wins gold in platform and springboard diving in the 1948 Olympics, becoming the first Asian-American to win a gold medal in the Summer Olympics.

Tennis 

 1989: Michael Chang becomes the first Asian-American winner of a Grand Slam tennis tournament in men's singles, winning the French Open. To this day, he remains the only male player of Asian descent, regardless of nationality, to win a men's singles Grand Slam event.

See also 

 List of Asian Americans
 List of Asian American jurists
 List of Asian-American writers
 List of African American firsts
 List of Native American firsts

References 

Asian-American
Asian-American culture
Asian-American art
Asian-American cinema